Trương Văn Hải is a Vietnamese football defender who plays for Vietnamese V-League club Bình Dương.

References

Vietnamese footballers
Living people
1975 births
Navibank Sài Gòn FC players
Association football defenders